Thomas Joannes Stieltjes (29 December 1856 – 31 December 1894) was a Dutch mathematician. He was a pioneer in the field of moment problems and contributed to the study of continued fractions. The Thomas Stieltjes Institute for Mathematics at Leiden University, dissolved in 2011, was named after him, as is the Riemann–Stieltjes integral.

Biography
Stieltjes was born in Zwolle on 29 December 1856. His father (who had the same first names) was a civil engineer and politician. Stieltjes Sr. was responsible for the construction of various harbours around Rotterdam, and also seated in the Dutch parliament. Stieltjes Jr. went to university at the Polytechnical School in Delft in 1873. Instead of attending lectures, he spent his student years reading the works of Gauss and Jacobi — the consequence of this being he failed his examinations. There were 2 further failures (in 1875 and 1876), and his father despaired. His father was friends with H. G. van de Sande Bakhuyzen (who was the director of Leiden University), and Stieltjes Jr. was able to get a job as an assistant at Leiden Observatory.

Soon afterwards, Stieltjes began a correspondence with Charles Hermite which lasted for the rest of his life. He originally wrote to Hermite concerning celestial mechanics, but the subject quickly turned to mathematics and he began to devote his spare time to mathematical research.

The director of Leiden Observatory, van de Sande-Bakhuyzen, responded quickly to Stieltjes' request on 1 January 1883 to stop his observational work to allow him to work more on mathematical topics. In 1883, he also married Elizabeth Intveld in May. She also encouraged him to move from astronomy to mathematics. And in September, Stieltjes was asked to substitute at University of Delft for F.J. van den Berg. From then until December of that year, he lectured on analytical geometry and on descriptive geometry. He resigned his post at the observatory at the end of that year.

In 1884, Stieltjes applied for a chair in Groningen. He was initially accepted, but in the end turned down by the Department of Education, since he lacked the required diplomas. In 1884, Hermite and professor David Bierens de Haan arranged for an honorary doctorate to be granted to Stieltjes by Leiden University, enabling him to become a professor. In 1885, he was appointed as member of the Royal Dutch Academy of Sciences (Koninklijke Nederlandse Akademie van Wetenschappen, KNAW), the next year he became foreign member. In 1889, he was appointed professor of differential and integral calculus at Toulouse University.

Research

Stieltjes worked on almost all branches of analysis, continued fractions and number theory, and for his work, he is sometimes called "the father of the analytic theory of continued fractions".

His work is also seen as important as a first step towards the theory of Hilbert spaces. Other important contributions to mathematics that he made involved discontinuous functions and divergent series, differential equations, interpolation, the gamma function and elliptic functions. He became known internationally because of the Riemann–Stieltjes integral.

Awards

Stieltjes' work on continued fractions earned him the Ormoy Prize of the Académie des Sciences.

See also
 Chebyshev–Markov–Stieltjes inequalities
 Lebesgue–Stieltjes integral
 Laplace–Stieltjes transform
 Riemann–Stieltjes integral
 Heine–Stieltjes polynomials
 Stieltjes–Wigert polynomials
 Stieltjes polynomials
 Stieltjes constants
 Stieltjes matrix
 Stieltjes moment problem
 Stieltjes transformation (and Stieltjes inversion formula)
 Annales de la Faculté des Sciences de Toulouse co-founded by Stieltjes
 Montel's theorem

References

External links

 
 
 Œuvres complètes de Thomas Jan Stieltjes, pub. par les soins de la Société mathématique d'Amsterdam. (Groningen: P. Noordhoff, 1914–18) (PDF copy at UMDL, text in Dutch, French and German)

1856 births
1894 deaths
French mathematicians
Academic staff of the Delft University of Technology
Members of the Royal Netherlands Academy of Arts and Sciences
People from Zwolle
19th-century Dutch scientists
19th-century Dutch mathematicians